Franco-Provençal (also Francoprovençal, Patois or Arpitan) is a language within Gallo-Romance originally spoken in east-central France, western Switzerland and northwestern Italy.

Franco-Provençal has several distinct dialects and is separate from but closely related to neighbouring Romance dialects (the langues d'oïl and the langues d'oc, in France, as well as Rhaeto-Romance in Switzerland and Italy).

Even with all its distinct dialects counted together, the number of Franco-Provençal speakers has been declining significantly and steadily. According to UNESCO, Franco-Provençal was already in 1995 a "potentially endangered language" in Italy and an "endangered language" in Switzerland and France. Ethnologue classifies it as "nearly extinct".

The designation Franco-Provençal dates to the 19th century. In the late 20th century, it was proposed that the language be referred to under the neologism Arpitan, and its areal as Arpitania; the use of both neologisms remains very limited, with most academics using the traditional form (often written without the dash: Francoprovençal), while its speakers actually refer to it almost exclusively as patois or under the names of its distinct dialects (Savoyard, Lyonnais, Gaga in Saint-Étienne, etc.).

Formerly spoken throughout the Duchy of Savoy, Franco-Provençal is nowadays spoken mainly in the Aosta Valley as a native language by all age ranges. All remaining areas of the Franco-Provençal language region show a limited practice to higher age ranges, except for Evolène and other rural areas of French-speaking Switzerland. It was also historically spoken in the Alpine valleys around Turin and in two isolated towns (Faeto and Celle di San Vito) in Apulia.

In France, it is one of the three Gallo-Romance language families of the country (alongside the langues d'oïl and the langues d'oc). Though it is a regional language of France, its use in the country is marginal. Still, organizations are attempting to preserve it through cultural events, education, scholarly research, and publishing.

Classification 
Despite Franco-Provençal's name would suggest it is a bridge dialect between French and the Provençal dialect of Occitan, it is a separate Gallo-Romance language that transitions into the Oïl languages Morvandiau and Franc-Comtois to the northwest, into Romansh to the east, into the Gallo-Italic Piemontese to the southeast, and finally into the Vivaro-Alpine dialect of Occitan to the southwest.

The philological classification for Franco-Provençal published by the Linguasphere Observatory (Dalby, 1999/2000, p. 402) follows:

A philological classification for Franco-Provençal published by Ruhlen (1987, pp. 325–326) is as follows:

History 
Franco-Provençal emerged as a Gallo-Romance variety of Latin. The linguistic region comprises east-central France, western portions of Switzerland, and the Aosta Valley of Italy with the adjacent alpine valleys of the Piedmont. This area covers territories once occupied by pre-Roman Celts, including the Allobroges, Sequani, Helvetii, Ceutrones, and Salassi. By the fifth century, the region was controlled by the Burgundians. Federico Krutwig has also detected a Basque substrate in the toponyms of the easternmost Valdôtain dialect.

Franco-Provençal is first attested in manuscripts from the 12th century, possibly diverging from the langues d'oïl as early as the eighth–ninth centuries (Bec, 1971). However, Franco-Provençal is consistently typified by a strict, myopic comparison to French, and so is characterized as "conservative". Thus, commentators, like Désormaux, consider "medieval" the terms for many nouns and verbs, including pâta "rag", bayâ "to give", moussâ "to lie down", all of which are conservative only relative to French. As an example, Désormaux, writing on this point in the foreword of his Savoyard dialect dictionary, states:

Franco-Provençal failed to garner the cultural prestige of its three more widely spoken neighbors:  French, Occitan, and Italian. Communities, where speakers lived, were generally mountainous and isolated from one another. The internal boundaries of the entire speech area were divided by wars and religious conflicts.

France, Switzerland, the Franche-Comté (protected by Habsburg Spain), and the duchy, later kingdom, ruled by the House of Savoy politically divided the region. The strongest possibility for any dialect of Franco-Provençal to establish itself as a major language died when an edict, dated 6 January 1539, was confirmed in the parliament of the Duchy of Savoy on 4 March 1540 (the duchy was partially occupied by France since 1538). The edict explicitly replaced Latin (and by implication, any other language) with French as the language of law and the courts (Grillet, 1807, p. 65).

The name Franco-Provençal (franco-provenzale) is due to Graziadio Isaia Ascoli  (1878), chosen because the dialect group was seen as intermediate between French and Provençal. Franco-Provençal dialects were widely spoken in their speech areas until the 20th century. As French political power expanded and the "single-national-language" doctrine was spread through French-only education, Franco-Provençal speakers abandoned their language, which had numerous spoken variations and no standard orthography, in favor of culturally prestigious French.

Origin of the name 
Franco-Provençal is an extremely fragmented language, with scores of highly peculiar local variations that never merged over time. The range of dialect diversity is far greater than that found in the langue d'oïl and Occitan regions. Comprehension of one dialect by speakers of another is often difficult. Nowhere is it spoken in a "pure form" and there is not a "standard reference language" that the modern generic label used to identify the language may indicate. This explains why speakers use local terms to name it, such as Bressan, Forèzien, or Valdôtain, or simply patouès ("patois"). Only in recent years have speakers not specialists in linguistics become conscious of the language's collective identity.

The language region was first recognized in the 19th century during advances in research into the nature and structure of human speech. Graziadio Isaia Ascoli (1829–1907), a pioneering linguist, analyzed the unique phonetic and structural characteristics of numerous spoken dialects. In an article written about 1873 and published later, he offered a solution to existing disagreements about dialect frontiers and proposed a new linguistic region. He placed it between the langues d'oïl group of languages (Franco) and the langues d'oc group (Provençal) and gave Franco-Provençal its name.

Ascoli (1878, p. 61) described the language in these terms in his defining essay on the subject:

Although the name Franco-Provençal appears misleading, it continues to be used in most scholarly journals for the sake of continuity. Suppression of the hyphen between the two parts of the language name in French (francoprovençal) was generally adopted following a conference at the University of Neuchâtel in 1969, however, most English journals continue to use the traditional spelling.

The name Romand has been in use regionally in Switzerland at least since 1494, when notaries in Fribourg were directed to write their minutes in both German and Rommant. It continues to appear in the names of many Swiss cultural organizations today. The term "Romand" is also used by some professional linguists who feel that the compound word "Franco-Provençal" is "inappropriate".

A proposal in the 1960s to call the language Burgundian (French: "burgondien") did not take hold, mainly because of the potential for confusion with an Oïl dialect known as Burgundian, which is spoken in a neighbouring area, known in English as Burgundy. Other areas also had historical or political claims to such names, especially (Meune, 2007).

Some contemporary speakers and writers prefer the name Arpitan because it underscores the independence of the language and does not imply a union to any other established linguistic group. "Arpitan" is derived from an indigenous word meaning "alpine" ("mountain highlands"). It was popularized in the 1980s by Mouvement Harpitanya, a political organization in the Aosta Valley. In the 1990s, the term lost its particular political context. The Aliance Culturèla Arpitana (Arpitan Cultural Alliance) is currently advancing the cause for the name "Arpitan" through the Internet, publishing efforts, and other activities. The organization was founded in 2004 by Stéphanie Lathion and Alban Lavy in Lausanne, Switzerland, and is now based in Fribourg. In 2010 SIL adopted the name "Arpitan" as the primary name of the language in ISO 639-3, with "Francoprovençal" as an additional name form.

The language is called patouès (patois) or nosta moda ("our way [of speaking]") by native speakers. Some Savoyard speakers call their language sarde. This is a colloquial term used because their ancestors were subjects of the Kingdom of Sardinia ruled by the House of Savoy until Savoie and Haute-Savoie were annexed by France in 1860. The language is called gaga in France's Forez region and appears in the titles of dictionaries and other regional publications. Gaga (and the adjective ) comes from a local name for the residents of Saint-Étienne, popularized by Auguste Callet's story "La légende des Gagats" published in 1866.

Geographic distribution 

The historical linguistic domain of the Franco-Provençal language are:

Italy 
Aosta Valley (place name in Valdôtain patois: Val d'Outa; in Italian: Valle d'Aosta; in French: Vallée d'Aoste); excepting the Walser-speaking valley, the villages of Gressoney-Saint-Jean, Gressoney-La-Trinité and Issime (Lys valley).
 the alpine heights of the Metropolitan City of Turin in the Piedmont basin which includes the following 43 communities: Ala di Stura, Alpette, Balme, Cantoira (Cantoire), Carema (Carême), Castagnole Piemonte, Ceres, Ceresole Reale (Cérisoles), Chialamberto (Chalambert), Chianocco (Chanoux), Coassolo Torinese, Coazze (Couasse), Condove (Condoue), Corio (Corio), Frassinetto (Frasinei), Germagnano (Saint-Germain), Giaglione (Jaillons), Giaveno, Gravere (Gravière), Groscavallo (Groscaval), Ingria, Lanzo Torinese (Lans), Lemie, Locana, Mattie, Meana di Susa (Méan), Mezzenile (Mesnil), Monastero di Lanzo (Moutier), Noasca, Novalesa (Novalaise), Pessinetto, Pont-Canavese, Ribordone (Ribardon), Ronco Canavese (Ronc), Rubiana (Rubiane), Sparone (Esparon), Susa (Suse), Traves, Usseglio (Ussel), Valgioie (Valjoie), Valprato Soana (Valpré), Venaus (Vénaux), Viù (Vieu). Note: The southernmost valleys of Piedmont speak Occitan.
 two enclaves in the Province of Foggia, Apulia region in the southern Apennine Mountains: the villages of Faeto and Celle di San Vito.

France 

 the major part of Rhône-Alpes and Franche-Comté regions, which includes the following départements: Jura (southern two-thirds), Doubs (southern third), Haute-Savoie, Savoie, Isère (except the southern edge which traditionally spoke occitan), Rhône, Drôme (extreme north), Ardèche (extreme north), Loire, Ain, and Saône-et-Loire (southern edge).

Switzerland 

 most of the officially French-speaking Romandie (Suisse-Romande) part of the country, including the following cantons: Geneva (Genève/Genf), Vaud, the lower part of Valais (Wallis), Fribourg (Freiburg), and Neuchâtel. Note: the remaining parts of Romandie, namely Jura, and the northern valleys of the canton Berne linguistically belong to the langues d'oïl.

Present status 
The Aosta Valley is the only region of the Franco-Provençal area where this language is still widely spoken as native by all age ranges of the population. Several events have combined to stabilize the language (Valdôtain dialect) in this region since 1948. An amendment to the constitution of Italy changed the status of the former province to an autonomous region which gives the Aosta Valley special powers to make its own decisions. Residents saw the region's economy expand and the population increase from 1951 to 1991, which encouraged them to stay and continue long-held traditions. The language is now explicitly protected by an Italian presidential decree and a national law. Further, a regional law passed by the government in Aosta requires educators to promote knowledge of Franco-Provençal language and culture in the school curriculum. Several cultural groups, libraries, and theatre companies are fostering a sense of ethnic pride with their active use of the Valdôtain dialect as well (EUROPA, 2005).

Paradoxically, the same federal laws do not grant the language the same protection in the Province of Turin because Franco-Provençal speakers make up less than 15% of the population. Lack of jobs has caused migration out of the Piedmont's alpine valleys, abetting the language's decline.

Switzerland does not recognize Romand (not be confused with Romansh) as one of its official languages. Speakers live in western cantons where Swiss French predominates and converse in dialects mainly as a second language. Currently, its use in agrarian daily life is rapidly disappearing. However, in a few isolated places the decline is considerably less steep. This is most notably the case for Evolène.

Franco-Provençal has had a precipitous decline in France. The official language of the French Republic is French (article 2 of the Constitution of France). The French government officially recognizes Franco-Provençal as one of the "languages of France", but it is constitutionally barred from ratifying the 1992 European Charter for Regional or Minority Languages (ECRML) that would guarantee it certain rights. Thus, Franco-Provençal has almost no political support. It also carries a generally low social status. This situation affects most regional languages that comprise the linguistic wealth of France. Speakers of regional languages are aging and mostly rural.

Number of speakers 

The Franco-Provençal dialect with the greatest population of active daily speakers is Valdôtain. Approximately 68,000 people speak the language in the Aosta Valley region of Italy according to reports conducted after the 2003 census. The alpine valleys of the adjacent province of Turin have an estimated 22,000 speakers. The Faetar and Cigliàje dialect is spoken by just 1,400 speakers who live in an isolated pocket of the province of Foggia in the southern Italian Apulia region (figures for Italy: EUROPA, 2005). Beginning in 1951, heavy emigration from the town of Celle Di San Vito established the Cigliàje variety of this dialect in Brantford, Ontario, Canada, where, at its peak, it was used daily by several hundred people.  As of 2012 this community has dwindled to fewer than 50 daily speakers across three generations.

Contrary to official information reported by the European Commission, a poll by the Fondation Émile Chanoux in 2001 revealed that only 15% of all Aosta Valley residents claimed Franco-Provençal as their mother tongue, a substantial reduction to the figures reported on the Italian census 20 years earlier that was used in the commission report, though 55.77% said they know Franco-provençal and 50.53% said they know French, Franco-provençal and Italian. This opened a discussion about the concept of mother tongue when concerning a dialect, therefore confirming the fact that the Aosta Valley is the only area where franco-provençal is actively spoken nowadays. A report published by Laval University in Quebec City, which analyzed this data, reports that it is "probable" that the language will be "on the road to extinction" in this region in ten years. The 2009 edition of ethnologue.com (Lewis, 2009) reports that there are 70,000 Franco-Provençal speakers in Italy. However, these figures are derived from the 1971 census.

In rural areas of the cantons of Valais and Fribourg in Switzerland, various dialects are spoken as a second language by about 7,000 residents (figures for Switzerland: Lewis, 2009). In the other cantons of Romandie where Franco-Provençal dialects used to be spoken, they are now all but extinct.

Until the mid-19th century, Franco-Provençal dialects were the most widely spoken language in their domain in France. Today, regional vernaculars are limited to a small number of speakers in secluded towns. A 2002 report by the INED (Institut national d'études démographiques) states that the language loss by generation: "the proportion of fathers who did not usually speak to their 5-year-old children in the language that their own father usually spoke in to them at the same age" was 90%. This was a greater loss than any other language in France, a loss called "critical". The report estimated that fewer than 15,000 speakers in France were handing down some knowledge of Franco-Provençal to their children (figures for France: Héran, Filhon, & Deprez, 2002; figure 1, 1-C, p. 2).

Linguistic structure 
Note: The overview in this section follows Martin (2005), with all Franco-Provençal examples written in accordance with Orthographe de référence B (see "Orthography" section, below).

Typology and syntax 

 Franco-Provençal is a synthetic language, as are Occitan and Italian. Most verbs have different endings for person, number, and tenses, making the use of the pronoun optional; thus, two grammatical functions are bound together. However, the second-person singular verb form regularly requires an appropriate pronoun for distinction.
 The standard word order for Franco-Provençal is subject–verb–object (SVO) form in a declarative sentence, for example: Vos côsâds anglès. ("You speak English."), except when the object is a pronoun, in which case the word order is subject–object–verb (SOV). verb–subject–object (VSO) form is standard word order for an interrogative sentence, for example: Côsâds-vos anglès ? ("Do you speak English?")

Morphology 
Franco-Provençal has grammar similar to that of other Romance languages.

Phonology 
The consonants and vowel sounds in Franco-Provençal:

Vowels 

 The sounds  are mostly phonemic in the dialects of Savoy, Val d'Aosta, and Lyon.

Consonants 

A nasal sound  can occur when a nasal precedes a velar stop.
In rare dialects, a palatal lateral  can be realized as a voiced fricative .
 In the dialects of Valdôtien, Fribourg, Valais, Vaudois and in some dialects of Savoyard and Dauphinois, realizations of phonemes  often are heard as affricate sounds . In the dialects of French-speaking Switzerland, Valle d'Aosta, and Neuchâtel, the two palatal stops are realized as the affricates, .
 The placement of stressed syllables in the spoken language is a primary characteristic of Franco-Provençal that distinguishes it from French and Occitan. Franco-Provençal words take stress on the last syllable, as in French, or on the penultimate syllable, unlike French.
 Franco-Provençal also preserves final vowel sounds, in particular "a" in feminine forms and "o" in masculine forms (where it is pronounced "ou" in some regions.)
Vowels followed by nasal consonants "m" and "n" are normally nasalized in a similar manner to those in French, for example, chantar and vin in Franco-Provençal, and "chanter" and "vin" in French. However, in the largest part of the Franco-Provençal domain, nasalized vowels retain a timbre that more closely approaches the un-nasalized vowel sound than in French, for example, pan  and vent  in Franco-Provençal, compared to "pain"  and "vent"  in French.

Orthography 
Franco-Provençal does not have a standard orthography. Most proposals use the Latin script and four diacritics: the acute accent, grave accent, circumflex, and diaeresis (trema), while the cedilla and the ligature  found in French are omitted.

 Aimé Chenal and Raymond Vautherin wrote the first comprehensive grammar and dictionary for any variety of Franco-Provençal. Their landmark effort greatly expands upon the work by Jean-Baptiste Cerlogne begun in the 19th century on the Valdôtain (Valdotèn) dialect of the Aosta Valley. It was published in twelve volumes from 1967 to 1982.
 The Bureau régional pour l'ethnologie et la linguistique (BREL) in Aosta and the Centre d'études franco-provençales « René Willien » (CEFP) in Saint-Nicolas, Italy, have created a similar orthography that is actively promoted by their organizations. It is also based on work by Jean-Baptiste Cerlogne, with several modifications.
 An orthographic method called La Graphie de Conflans has achieved fairly wide acceptance among speakers residing in Bresse and Savoy. Since it was first proposed by the Groupe de Conflans of Albertville, France in 1983, it has appeared in many published works. This method perhaps most closely follows the International Phonetic Alphabet, omitting extraneous letters found in other historical and contemporary proposals. It features the use of a combining low line (underscore) as a diacritic to indicate a stressed vowel in the penult when it occurs, for example: toma, déssanta.
 A recent standard entitled Orthographe de référence B (ORB) was proposed by linguist Dominique Stich with his dictionary published by Editions Le Carré in 2003. (This is an emendation of his previous work published by Editions l'Harmattan in 1998.) His standard strays from close representation of Franco-Provençal phonology in favor of following French orthographic conventions, with silent letters and clear vestiges of Latin roots. However, it attempts to unify several written forms and is easiest for French speakers to read. — Note: Stich's dictionary for ORB is noteworthy because it includes neologisms by Xavier Gouvert for things found in modern life, such as: encafâblo for "cell phone" (from encafar, "to put into a pocket"), pignochière for "fast-food" (from pignochiér, "to nibble"), panètes for "corn flakes" (from panet, "maize, corn"), and mâchelyon for "chewing gum".

The table below compares a few words in each writing system, with French and English for reference. (Sources: Esprit Valdôtain (download 7 March 2007), C.C.S. Conflans (1995), and Stich (2003).

{| class="wikitable"
|- style="background:#f9f9f9;"
! colspan="5" style="width:90px;" | Franco-Provençal
! style="width:90px;" | Occitan
! style="width:90px;" | Italian
! style="width:90px;" | French
! style="width:90px;" | Spanish
! style="width:90px;" | English
|-

|- style="background:#f9f9f9;"
! style="width:90px;" |IPA
! style="width:90px;" |Chenal
! style="width:90px;" |BREL
! style="width:90px;" |Conflans
! style="width:90px;" |ORB
! style="width:90px;" | Provençal
! style="width:90px;" | Standard
! style="width:90px;" | Standard
! style="width:90px;" | Standard
! style="width:90px;" | Standard

|-
||||quan||can||kan||quand||quand, quora||quando||quand||cuando|| when
|-
||||tsëca||tchica||tchika||checa||un pauc||un po||un peu||un poco|| a little
|-
||||tsan||tsan||tsan||champ||tèrra||campo||champ||campo|| field
|-
||||dzoà||djouà||djoua||juè||jòc||gioco||jeu||juego|| game
|-
||||tseuvra||tcheuvra||tseûvra||chiévra||cabra||capra||chèvre||cabra|| goat
|-
||||foille||foille||fòye||fôlye||fuelha||foglia||feuille||hoja|| leaf
|-
||||faille||feuille||feûye||felye||filha||figlia||fille||hija|| daughter
|-
||||fontana||fontan-a||fontana||fontana||fònt||fontana||fontaine||fuente|| wellspring
|-
||||lana||lan-a||lana||lana||lana||lana||laine||lana|| wool
|-
||||silence||silanse||silanse||silence||silenci||silenzio||silence||silencio|| silence
|-
||||repeublecca||repebleucca||repebleûke||rèpublica||republica||repubblica||république||república|| republic
|}

 Numerals 
Franco-Provençal uses a decimal counting system. The numbers "1", "2", and "4" have masculine and feminine forms (Duplay, 1896; Viret, 2006).

0) zérô; 1) yon (masc.), yona / yena (fem.); 2) dos (masc.), does / doves / davè (fem.); 3) três; 4) quatro (masc.), quat / quatrè (fem.); 5) cinq; 6) siéx; 7) sèpt; 8) huét; 9) nô; 10) diéx; 11) onze; 12) doze; 13) trèze; 14) quatôrze; 15) quinze; 16) sèze; 17) dix-sèpt; 18) dix-huét; 19) dix-nou; 20) ; 21)  / ; 22)  ... 30) trenta; 40) quaranta; 50) cinquanta; 60) souessanta; 70) sèptanta; 80) huétanta; 90) nonanta; 100) cent; 1000) mila; 1,000,000) .

Many western dialects use a vigesimal (base-20) form for "80", that is, quatro-vingt , possibly due to the influence of French.

 Word comparisons 
The chart below compares words in Franco-Provençal to those in selected Romance languages, with English for reference.

Between vowels, the Latinate "p" became "v", "c" and "g" became "y", and "t" and "d" disappeared. Franco-Provençal also softened the hard palatized "c" and "g" before "a". This led Franco-Provençal to evolve down a different path from Occitan and Gallo-Iberian languages, closer to the evolutionary direction taken by French.

 Dialects 

Classification of Franco-Provençal dialect divisions is challenging. Each canton and valley uses its own vernacular without standardization. Difficult intelligibility among dialects was noted as early as 1807 by Grillet.

The dialects are divided into eight distinct categories or groups. Six dialect groups comprising 41 dialect idioms for the Franco-Provençal language have been identified and documented by Linguasphere Observatory (Observatoire Linguistique) (Dalby, 1999/2000, pp. 402–403). Only two dialect groups – Lyonnaise and Dauphinois-N. – were recorded as having fewer than 1,000 speakers each. Linguasphere has not listed any dialect idiom as "extinct", however, many are highly endangered. A seventh isolated dialect group, consisting of Faetar (also known as "Cigliàje" or "Cellese"), has been analyzed by Nagy (2000). The Piedmont dialects need further study.

Dialect Group : Dialect Idiom: (Epicenters / Regional locations)Lyonnais: (France)

1. Bressan (Bresse, Ain (département) west; Revermont, French Jura (département) southwest; Saône-et-Loire east),
2. Bugésien (Bugey, Ain southeast),
3. Mâconnais (Mâcon country),
4. Lyonnais-rural (Lyonnais mountains, Dombes, & Balmes)
5. Roannais+Stéphanois (Roanne country, Foréz plain, & Saint-Étienne).

Dauphinois-N.: (France)

1. Dauphinois-Rhodanien (Rhône River valley, Rhône (département) south, Loire (département) southeast, Ardèche north, Drôme north, Isère west),
2. Crémieu (Crémieu, Isère north),
3. Terres-Froides (Bourbre River valley, Isère central north),
4. Chambaran (Roybon, Isère central south),
5. Grésivaudan [& Uissans] (Isère east).

Savoyard: (France)

1. Bessanèis (Bessans),
2. Langrin (Lanslebourg),
3. Matchutin (Valloire & Ma’tchuta) (1., 2. & 3.: Maurienne country, Arc valley, Savoie south),
4. Tartentaise [& Tignard] (Tarentaise country, Tignes, Savoie east, Isère upper valleys),
5. Arly (Arly valley, Ugine, Savoie north),
6. Chambérien (Chambéry),
7. Annecien [& Viutchoïs] (Annecy, Viuz-la-Chiésaz, Haute-Savoie southwest),
8. Faucigneran (Faucigny, Haute-Savoie southeast),
9. Chablaisien+Genevois (Chablais country & Geneva (canton) hinterlands).

Franc-Comtois (FrP) [Jurassien-Méridional]: (Switzerland & France)

1. Neuchâtelois (Neuchâtel (canton)),
2. Vaudois-NW. (Vaud northwest),
3. Pontissalien (Pontarlier & Doubs (département) south),
4. Ain-N. (Ain upper valleys & French Jura),
5. Valserine (Bellegarde-sur-Valserine, Valserine valley, Ain northeast & adjacent French Jura).

Vaudois: (Switzerland)

1. Vaudois-Intracluster (Vaud west),
2. Gruyèrienne (Fribourg (canton) west),
3. Enhaut (Château-d'Œx, Pays-d'Enhaut, Vaud east),
4. Valaisan (Valais, Valaisan Romand).

Valdôtain: (Aosta Valley, Italy)

1. Valdôtain du Valdigne (Dora Baltea upper valley, similar to savoyard Franco-Provençal),
2. Aostois (Aostan valdôtain),
3. Valdôtain standard (Dora Baltea middle valley),
4. Valpellinois, bossolein and bionassin (Valpelline Great St. Bernard and Bionaz valleys),
5. Cognein (upper Cogne valley),
6. Valtournain (in Valtournenche valley),
7. Ayassin (upper Ayas valley),
8. Valgrisein (Valgrisenche valley),
9. Rhêmiard (Rhêmes valley),
10. Valsavarein (Valsavarenche valley),
11. Moyen valdôtain (middle-lower Dora Baltea valley),
12. Bas Valdôtain (lower Dora Baltea valley, similar to Piedmontese),
13. Champorcherin (Champorcher valley)
14. Fénisan (Fénis)

Faetar, Cigliàje: (Italy)

1. Faetar & Cigliàje (Faeto & Celle di San Vito, in Province of Foggia).  This variety is also spoken in Brantford, Ontario, Canada by an established emigrant community.

Piedmont Dialects: (Italy)

 (Note: Comparative analyses of dialect idioms in the Piedmont basin of the Metropolitan City of Turin — from the Val Soana in the north to the Val Sangone in the south — have not been published).

Dialect examples 
Several modern orthographic variations exist for all dialects of Franco-Provençal. The spellings and IPA equivalents listed below appear in Martin (2005).

External links:
 ALMURA: Atlas linguistique multimédia de la région Rhône-Alpes et des régions limitrophes — Multimedia website from Stendhal University-Grenoble 3 with MP3 audio clips of more than 700 words and expressions by native speakers grouped in 15 themes by village. The linguistic atlas demonstrates the transition from Franco-Provençal phonology in the north to Occitan phonology in the south. (select: ATLAS)
 L'Atlas linguistique audiovisuel du Valais romand — Multimedia website from the University of Neuchâtel with audio and video clips of Franco-Provençal speakers from the canton of Valais, Switzerland.
 Les Langues de France en chansons: N'tra Linga e Chanfon — Multimedia website with numerous audio clips of native Franco-Provençal speakers singing traditional songs. Select: TRAINS DIRECTS → scroll to: Francoprovençal.

Toponyms 
Other than in family names, the Franco-Provençal legacy survives primarily in placenames. These suffixes are vestiges of an old medieval orthographic practice indicating the stressed syllable of a word. In polysyllables, 'z' indicates a paroxytone (stress on penultimate syllable) and 'x' indicates an oxytone (stress on last syllable). So, Chanaz  (shana) but Chênex  (shèné). The following is a list of all such toponyms:

Italy 
 Aosta Valley: Bionaz, Champdepraz, Morgex, and Perloz
 Piedmont: Oulx, and Sauze d'Oulx

France 
 Ain: Ambérieu-en-Bugey, Ambérieux-en-Dombes, Arbignieu, Belleydoux, Belmont-Luthézieu, Birieux, Boz, Brénaz, Ceyzérieu, Challex, Chanoz-Châtenay, Charnoz-sur-Ain, Chevroux, Civrieux, Cleyzieu, Colomieu, Contrevoz, Conzieu, Cormoz, Courmangoux, Culoz, Cuzieu, Flaxieu, Gex, Hostiaz, Injoux-Génissiat, Izieu, Jujurieux, Lagnieu, Lescheroux, Lochieu, Lompnieu, Léaz, Lélex, Malafretaz, Marboz, Marignieu, Marlieux, Massieux, Massignieu-de-Rives, Meximieux, Mijoux, Misérieux, Montagnieu, Monthieux, Murs-et-Gélignieux, Niévroz, Nurieux-Volognat, Oncieu, Ordonnaz, Ornex, Outriaz, Oyonnax, Parcieux, Perrex, Peyrieu, Peyzieux-sur-Saône, Pirajoux, Pollieu, Prémillieu, Pugieu, Reyrieux, Rignieux-le-Franc, Ruffieu, Saint-André-le-Bouchoux, Saint-André-sur-Vieux-Jonc, Saint-Germain-de-Joux, Saint-Jean-le-Vieux, Saint-Nizier-le-Bouchoux, Saint-Paul-de-Varax, Sault-Brénaz, Seillonnaz, Songieu, Sonthonnax-la-Montagne, Surjoux, Sutrieu, Talissieu, Thézillieu, Torcieu, Toussieux, Trévoux, Vernoux, Versailleux, Versonnex, Vieu, Vieu-d'Izenave, Villieu-Loyes-Mollon, Virieu-le-Grand, Virieu-le-Petit, and Échenevex
 Ardèche: Ajoux, Beaulieu, Boucieu-le-Roi, Boulieu-lès-Annonay, Châteauneuf-de-Vernoux, Colombier-le-Vieux, Coux, Davézieux, Dunière-sur-Eyrieux, Lavilledieu, Le Roux, Les Ollières-sur-Eyrieux, Roiffieux, Saint-Fortunat-sur-Eyrieux, Saint-Jacques-d'Atticieux, Saint-Julien-le-Roux, Saint-Michel-de-Chabrillanoux, Saint-Pierre-sur-Doux, Saint-Étienne-de-Valoux, Satillieu, Talencieux, and Vinzieux
 Doubs: Bolandoz, Champoux, Chevroz, Châteauvieux-les-Fossés, Dampjoux, Deluz, Goux-les-Usiers, Goux-lès-Dambelin, Goux-sous-Landet, Grand'Combe-Châteleu, Granges-Narboz, La Cluse-et-Mijoux, Le Barboux, Le Bélieu, Les Hôpitaux-Vieux, Les Villedieu, Montmahoux, Montécheroux, Reculfoz, Saraz, Doubs, Verrières-de-Joux, Villars-sous-Dampjoux, and Éternoz
 Drôme: Allex, Clérieux, Génissieux, Marsaz, Molières-Glandaz, Montaulieu, Montjoux, Roussieux, Saint-Bardoux, Saint-Bonnet-de-Valclérieux, Solérieux, and Vassieux-en-Vercors
 Haute-Savoie: Alex, Annecy-le-Vieux, Arthaz-Pont-Notre-Dame, Aviernoz, Bernex, Cernex, Chainaz-les-Frasses, Charvonnex, Chavannaz, Chessenaz, Chevenoz, Chênex, Combloux, Copponex, Excenevex, La Clusaz, La Côte-d'Arbroz, La Forclaz, La Muraz, La Vernaz, Marcellaz, Marcellaz-Albanais, Marlioz, Marnaz, Menthonnex-en-Bornes, Menthonnex-sous-Clermont, Monnetier-Mornex, Mont-Saxonnex, Peillonnex, Reyvroz, Saint-Jorioz, Servoz, Seythenex, Seytroux, Vaulx, Veigy-Foncenex, Versonnex, Villaz, Ville-en-Sallaz, Villy-le-Pelloux, Viuz-en-Sallaz, Viuz-la-Chiésaz, and Vétraz-Monthoux
 Isère: Apprieu, Assieu, Beaulieu, Bellegarde-Poussieu, Bilieu, Bossieu, Bourgoin-Jallieu, Bouvesse-Quirieu, Bressieux, Cessieu, Chamagnieu, Charancieu, Charvieu-Chavagneux, Chassignieu, Chavanoz, Cheyssieu, Chélieu, Creys-Mépieu, Crémieu, Dizimieu, Diémoz, Dolomieu, Fitilieu, Granieu, Heyrieux, Jarcieu, La Chapelle-de-Surieu, Les Roches-de-Condrieu, Leyrieu, Lieudieu, Marcieu, Massieu, Meyrieu-les-Étangs, Moidieu-Détourbe, Moissieu-sur-Dolon, Monsteroux-Milieu, Montagnieu, Montalieu-Vercieu, Montseveroux, Notre-Dame-de-Vaulx, Optevoz, Ornacieux, Oz, Parmilieu, Pisieu, Porcieu-Amblagnieu, Proveysieux, Quincieu, Romagnieu, Saint-André-le-Gaz, Saint-Jean-de-Vaulx, Saint-Jean-le-Vieux, Saint-Julien-de-Raz, Saint-Martin-le-Vinoux, Saint-Pierre-de-Bressieux, Saint-Pierre-de-Méaroz, Saint-Romain-de-Surieu, Saint-Siméon-de-Bressieux, Saint-Victor-de-Cessieu, Sardieu, Sermérieu, Siccieu-Saint-Julien-et-Carisieu, Siévoz, Soleymieu, Succieu, Tignieu-Jameyzieu, Varacieux, Vatilieu, Vaulx-Milieu, Vernioz, Vertrieu, Veyssilieu, Vignieu, Villemoirieu, Virieu, and Vénérieu
 Jura: Bonlieu, Choux, Châtel-de-Joux, Courlaoux, Fontainebrux, Fraroz, Lajoux, Les Bouchoux, Marnoz, Menétrux-en-Joux, Molamboz, Moutoux, Onoz, Pagnoz, Ponthoux, Recanoz, Saffloz, Vannoz, Vertamboz, Villevieux, and Vulvoz
 Loire: Andrézieux-Bouthéon, Aveizieux, Bussy-Albieux, Champdieu, Chazelles-sur-Lavieu, Cuzieu, Doizieux, Grézieux-le-Fromental, Jonzieux, La Bénisson-Dieu, Lavieu, Marcoux, Mizérieux, Nandax, Nervieux, Nollieux, Pouilly-sous-Charlieu, Précieux, Saint-Haon-le-Vieux, Saint-Hilaire-sous-Charlieu, Saint-Jean-Soleymieux, Saint-Nizier-sous-Charlieu, Soleymieux, Unieux, and Épercieux-Saint-Paul
 Savoie: Aillon-le-Vieux, Allondaz, Avressieux, Avrieux, Barberaz, Chamoux-sur-Gelon, Chanaz, Chindrieux, Cohennoz, Conjux, Drumettaz-Clarafond, Entremont-le-Vieux, Frontenex, Jongieux, La Giettaz, La Motte-Servolex, Loisieux, Marcieux, Meyrieux-Trouet, Motz, Ontex, Ruffieux, Saint-Jean-de-Couz, Saint-Pierre-de-Genebroz, Saint-Thibaud-de-Couz, Sonnaz, Verthemex, and Villaroux
 Rhône: Affoux, Ambérieux, Brussieu, Cailloux-sur-Fontaines, Chassieu, Civrieux-d'Azergues, Colombier-Saugnieu, Condrieu, Courzieu, Décines-Charpieu, Fleurieu-sur-Saône, Fleurieux-sur-l'Arbresle, Grézieu-la-Varenne, Grézieu-le-Marché, Jarnioux, Joux, Lissieu, Meyzieu, Ouroux, Poleymieux-au-Mont-d'Or, Quincieux, Rillieux-la-Pape, Saint-Cyr-le-Chatoux, Saint-Pierre-de-Chandieu, Soucieu-en-Jarrest, Sourcieux-les-Mines, Toussieu, Vaulx-en-Velin, Ville-sur-Jarnioux, and Vénissieux
 Saône-et-Loire: Chalmoux, Clux, Lux, Marly-sur-Arroux, Ouroux-sous-le-Bois-Sainte-Marie, Ouroux-sur-Saône, Pontoux, Pouilloux, Rigny-sur-Arroux, Saint-Bonnet-de-Joux, Saint-Didier-sur-Arroux, Saint-Nizier-sur-Arroux, Saint-Pierre-le-Vieux, Thil-sur-Arroux, Toulon-sur-Arroux, Vendenesse-sur-Arroux, Verjux, and Étang-sur-Arroux

Switzerland 
 Fribourg: Chésopelloz, Crésuz, Ferpicloz, La Brillaz, La Folliaz, La Sonnaz, Neyruz, Noréaz, Pont-en-Ogoz, Prez-vers-Noréaz, Sévaz, Vaulruz, Villaz-Saint-Pierre, and Vuisternens-en-Ogoz
 Geneva: Bardonnex, Bernex, Choulex, Collex-Bossy, Laconnex, Le Grand-Saconnex, Onex, Perly-Certoux, Thônex, and Troinex
 Neuchâtel: Brot-Plamboz and La Chaux-du-Milieu
 Valais: Arbaz, Collombey-Muraz, Dorénaz, Evionnaz, Lax, Massongex, Mex, Nax, Nendaz, Vernayaz, Vex, Veysonnaz, Vionnaz, Vérossaz, and Vétroz
 Vaud: Arnex-sur-Nyon, Arnex-sur-Orbe, Bex, Bioley-Magnoux, Bioley-Orjulaz, Borex, Champtauroz, Chanéaz, Cheseaux-Noréaz, Chevroux, Château-d'Œx, Chéserex, Founex, La Sarraz, Mauraz, Mex, Mutrux, Neyruz-sur-Moudon, Palézieux, Paudex, Penthalaz, Penthaz, Penthéréaz, Puidoux, Rennaz, Rivaz, Ropraz, Saint-Légier-La Chiésaz, Saint-Prex, Saubraz, Signy-Avenex, Suscévaz, Tolochenaz, and Trélex

Literature 

A long tradition of Franco-Provençal literature exists, although no prevailing written form of the language has materialized. An early 12th-century fragment containing 105 verses from a poem about Alexander the Great may be the earliest known work in the language. Girart de Roussillon, an epic with 10,002 lines from the mid-12th century, has been asserted to be Franco-Provençal. It certainly contains prominent Franco-Provençal features, although the editor of an authoritative edition of this work claims that the language is a mixture of French and Occitan forms. A significant document from the same period containing a list of vassals in the County of Forez also is not without literary value.

Among the first historical writings in Franco-Provençal are legal texts by civil law notaries that appeared in the 13th century as Latin was being abandoned for official administration. These include a translation of the Corpus Juris Civilis (known as the Justinian Code) in the vernacular spoken in Grenoble. Religious works also were translated and conceived in Franco-Provençal dialects at some monasteries in the region. The Legend of Saint Bartholomew is one such work that survives in Lyonnais patois from the 13th century.

Marguerite d'Oingt (ca. 1240–1310), prioress of a Carthusian nunnery near Mionnay (France), composed two remarkable sacred texts in her native Lyonnais dialect, in addition to her writings in Latin. The first, entitled Speculum ("The Mirror"), describes three miraculous visions and their meanings. The other work, Li Via seiti Biatrix, virgina de Ornaciu ("The Life of the Blessed Virgin Beatrix d'Ornacieux"), is a long biography of a nun and mystic consecrated to the Passion whose faith lead to a devout cult. This text contributed to the beatification of the nun more than 500 years later by Pope Pius IX in 1869. A line from the work in her dialect follows:

 § 112 : « Quant vit co li diz vicayros que ay o coventavet fayre, ce alyet cela part et en ot mout de dongiers et de travayl, ancis que cil qui gardont lo lua d'Emuet li volissant layssyer co que il demandavet et que li evesques de Valenci o volit commandar. Totes veys yses com Deus o aveyt ordonat oy se fit. »

Religious conflicts in Geneva between Calvinist Reformers and staunch Catholics, supported by the Duchy of Savoy, brought forth many texts in Franco-Provençal during the early 17th century. One of the best known is Cé qu'è lainô ("The One Above"), which was composed by an unknown writer in 1603. The long narrative poem describes l'Escalade, a raid by the Savoyard army that generated patriotic sentiments. It became the unofficial national anthem of the Republic of Geneva. The first three verses follow below (in Genevois dialect) with a translation:

Several writers created satirical, moralistic, poetic, comic, and theatrical texts during the era that followed, which indicates the vitality of the language at that time. These include: Bernardin Uchard (1575–1624), author and playwright from Bresse; Henri Perrin, comic playwright from Lyon; Jean Millet (1600?–1675), author of pastorals, poems, and comedies from Grenoble; Jacques Brossard de Montaney (1638–1702), writer of comedies and carols from Bresse; Jean Chapelon (1647–1694), priest and composer of more than 1,500 carols, songs, epistles, and essays from Saint-Étienne; and François Blanc dit la Goutte (1690–1742), writer of prose poems, including Grenoblo maléirou about the great flood of 1733 in Grenoble. 19th century authors include Guillaume Roquille (1804–1860), working-class poet from Rive-de-Gier near Saint-Chamond, Joseph Béard dit l'Éclair (1805–1872), physician, poet, and songwriter from Rumilly, and Louis Bornet (1818–1880) of Gruyères. Clair Tisseur (1827–1896), architect of Bon-Pasteur Church in Lyon, published many writings under the pen name "Nizier du Puitspelu". These include a popular dictionary and humorous works in Lyonnaise dialect that have reprinted for more than 100 years.

Amélie Gex (1835–1883) wrote in her native patois as well as French. She was a passionate advocate for her language. Her literary efforts encompassed lyrical themes, work, love, tragic loss, nature, the passing of time, religion, and politics, and are considered by many to be the most significant contributions to the literature. Among her works are: Reclans de Savoué ("Echos from Savoy", 1879), Lo cent ditons de Pierre d'Emo ("One Hundred Sayings by Pierre du Bon-Sens", 1879), Poesies ("Poems", 1880), Vieilles gens et vieilles choses: Histoires de ma rue et de mon village ("Old people and old things: Stories from my street and from my village", 1889), Fables (1898), and Contio de la Bova ("Tales from the Cowshed").

The writings of the abbé Jean-Baptiste Cerlogne (1826–1910) are credited with reestablishing the cultural identity of the Aosta Valley. His early poetry includes:  (1855), Marenda a Tsesalet (1856) and La bataille di vatse a Vertosan (1858); among his scholarly works are: Petite grammaire du dialecte valdotain (1893), Dictionnaire du dialecte valdôtain (1908) and Le patois valdotain: son origine littéraire et sa graphie (1909). The Concours Cerlogne  – an annual event named in his honor – has focused thousands of Italian students on preserving the region's language, literature, and heritage since 1963.

At the end of the 19th century, regional dialects of Franco-Provençal were disappearing due to the expansion of the French language into all walks of life and the emigration of rural people to urban centers. Cultural and regional savant societies began to collect oral folk tales, proverbs, and legends from native speakers in an effort that continues to today. Numerous works have been published.

Prosper Convert (1852–1934), the bard of Bresse; Louis Mercier (1870–1951), folk singer and author of more than twelve volumes of prose from Coutouvre near Roanne; Just Songeon (1880–1940), author, poet, and activist from La Combe, Sillingy near Annecy; Eugénie Martinet (1896–1983), poet from Aosta; and Joseph Yerly (1896–1961) of Gruyères whose complete works were published in Kan la têra tsantè ("When the earth sang"), are well known for their use of patois in the 20th century.
Louis des Ambrois de Nevache, from Upper Susa Valley, transcribed popular songs and wrote some original poetry in local
patois.
There are compositions in the current language on the album Enfestar, an artistic project from Piedmont

The first comic book in a Franco-Provençal dialect, Le rebloshon que tyouè! ("The cheese that killed!"), from the Fanfoué des Pnottas series by Félix Meynet, appeared in 2000. Two popular works from The Adventures of Tintin and one from the Lucky Luke series were published in Franco-Provençal translations for young readers in 2006 and 2007.

See also 
 Language policy in France
 Languages of Italy
 Languages of France
 Languages of Switzerland
 Vergonha
 Da nosautri

Notes

References

Bibliography 

 Joze Harietta (Seudónimo de Joseph Henriet), La lingua arpitana : con particolare riferimento alla lingua della Val di Aosta, Tip. Ferrero & Cie. die Romano Canavese, 1976, 174 p.
 Ursula Reutner: 'Minor' Gallo-Romance Languages. In: Lebsanft, Franz/Tacke, Felix: Manual of Standardization in the Romance Languages. Berlin: de Gruyter (Manuals of Romance Linguistics 24), 773–807, ISBN 9783110455731.

Sources 

 Abry, Christian et al. "Groupe de Conflans" (1994). Découvrir les parlers de Savoie. Conflans (Savoie): Centre de la Culture Savoyarde. This work presents of one of the commonly used orthographic standards
 Aebischer, Paul (1950). Chrestomathie franco-provençale. Berne: Éditions A. Francke S.A.
 Agard, Frederick B. (1984). A Course in Romance Linguistics: A Diachronic View. (Vol. 2). Washington D.C.: Georgetown University Press. 
 Ascoli, Graziadio Isaia (1878). Schizzi Franco-provenzali. Archivio glottologico italiano, III, pp. 61–120. Article written about 1873.
 Bec, Pierre (1971). Manuel pratique de philologie romane. (Tome 2, pp. 357 et seq.). Paris: Éditions Picard.  A philological analysis of Franco-Provençal; the Alpine dialects have been particularly studied.
 Bessat, Hubert & Germi, Claudette (1991). Les mots de la montagne autour du Mont-Blanc. Grenoble: Ellug. 
 Bjerrome, Gunnar (1959). Le patois de Bagnes (Valais). Stockholm: Almkvist and Wiksell.
 Brocherel, Jules (1952). Le patois et la langue francaise en Vallée d’Aoste. Neuchâtel: V. Attinger.
 Centre de la Culture Savoyard, Conflans (1995). Écrire le patois: La Graphie de Conflans pour le Savoyard. Taninges: Éditions P.A.O. .pdf (in French)
 Cerlogne, Jean-Baptiste (1971). Dictionnaire du patois valdôtain, précédé de la petite grammaire. Geneva: Slatkine Reprints. (Original work published, Aosta: Imprimérie Catholique, 1907)
 Chenal, Aimé (1986). Le franco-provençal valdôtain: Morphologie et syntaxe. Quart: Musumeci. 
 Chenal, Aimé & Vautherin, Raymond (1967–1982). Nouveau dictionnaire de patois valdôtain. (12 vol.). Aoste : Éditions Marguerettaz.
 Chenal, Aimé & Vautherin, Raymond (1984). Nouveau dictionnaire de patois valdôtain; Dictionnaire français-patois. Quart: Musumeci. 
 Constantin, Aimé & Désormaux, Joseph (1982). Dictionnaire savoyard. Marseille: Éditions Jeanne Laffitte. (Originally published, Annecy: Société florimontane, 1902). 
 Cuaz-Châtelair, René (1989). Le Franco-provençal, mythe ou réalité'''. Paris, la Pensée universelle, pp. 70. 
 Cuisenier, Jean (Dir.) (1979). Les sources régionales de la Savoie: une approche ethnologique. Alimentation, habitat, élevage, agriculture.... (re: Abry, Christian: Le paysage dialectal.) Paris: Éditions Fayard.
 Dalby, David (1999/2000). The Linguasphere Register of the World's Languages and Speech Communities. (Vol. 2). (Breton, Roland, Pref.). Hebron, Wales, UK: Linguasphere Press.  See p. 402 for the complete list of 6 groups and 41 idioms of Franco-Provençal dialects.
 Dauzat, Albert & Rostaing, Charles (1984). Dictionnaire étymologique des noms de lieux en France. (2nd ed.). Paris: Librairie Guénégaud. 
 Devaux, André; Duraffour, A.; Dussert, A.-S.; Gardette, P.; & Lavallée, F. (1935). Les patois du Dauphiné. (2 vols.). Lyon: Bibliothèque de la Faculté catholique des lettres. Dictionary, grammar, & linguistic atlas of the Terres-Froides region.
 Duch, Célestin & Bejean, Henri (1998). Le patois de Tignes. Grenoble: Ellug. 
 Dunoyer, Christiane (2016). Le francoprovençal. Transmission, revitalisation et normalisation. Introduction aux travaux. "Actes de la conférence annuelle sur l’activité scientifique du Centre d’études francoprovençales René Willien de Saint-Nicolas, le 7 novembre 2015". Aosta, pp. 11–15.
 Duraffour, Antonin; Gardette, P.; Malapert, L. & Gonon, M. (1969). Glossaire des patois francoprovençaux. Paris: CNRS Éditions. 
 Elsass, Annie (Ed.) (1985). Jean Chapelon 1647–1694, Œuvres complètes. Saint-Étienne: Université de Saint-Étienne.
 Escoffier, Simone (1958). La rencontre de la langue d'Oïl, de la lange d'Oc, et de francoprovençal entre Loire et Allier. Publications de l'Institut linguistique romane de Lyon, XI, 1958.
 Escoffier, Simone & Vurpas, Anne-Marie (1981). Textes littéraires en dialecte lyonnais. Paris: CNRS Éditions. 
 EUROPA (European Commission) (2005). Francoprovençal in Italy, The Euromosaic Study. Last update: 4 February 2005.
 Favre, Christophe & Balet, Zacharie (1960). Lexique du Parler de Savièse. Romanica Helvetica, Vol. 71, 1960. Berne: Éditions A. Francke S.A.
 Gardette, l'Abbé Pierre, (1941). Études de géographie morphologique sur les patois du Forez. Mâcon: Imprimerie Protat frères.
 Gex, Amélie (1986). Contes et chansons populaires de Savoie. (Terreaux, Louis, Intro.). Aubenas: Curandera. 
 Gex, Amélie (1999). Vieilles gens et vieilles choses: Histoires de ma rue et de mon village. (Bordeaux, Henry, Pref.). Marseille: Éditions Jeanne Laffitte. (Original work published, Chambéry: Dardel, 1924). 
 Gossen, Charles Théodore (1970). La scripta para-francoprovençale, Revue de linguistique romane 34, p. 326–348.
 Grasset, Pierre & Viret, Roger (2006). Joseph Béard, dit l'Eclair : Médecin des pauvres, Poète patoisant, Chansonnier savoyard. (Terreaux, Louis, Pref.). Montmelian: La Fontaine de Siloé. 
 Grillet, Jean-Louis (1807). Dictionnaire historique, littéraire et statistique des départements du Mont-Blanc et du Léman. Chambéry: Librairie J.F. Puthod.
 Hauff, Tristan (2016). Le français régional de la Vallée d’Aoste: Aspects sociolinguistiques et phonologiques. Universitetet i Oslo.
 Héran, François; Filhon, Alexandra; & Deprez, Christine (2002). Language transmission in France in the course of the 20th century. Population & Sociétés. No. 376, February 2002. Paris: INED-Institut national d’études démographiques. . Monthly newsletter in English, from INED
 Hoyer, Gunhild & Tuaillon, Gaston (2002). Blanc-La-Goutte, poète de Grenoble: Œuvres complètes. Grenoble: Centre alpin et rhodanien d'ethnologie.
 Humbert, Jean (1983). Nouveau glossaire genevois. Genève: Slatkine Reprints. (Original work published, Geneva: 1852). 
 Iannàccaro, Gabriele & Dell'Aquila, Vittorio (2003). "Investigare la Valle d’Aosta: metodologia di raccolta e analisi dei dati". In: Caprini, Rita (ed.): "Parole romanze. Scritti per Michel Contini", Alessandria: Edizioni Dell'Orso
 Jochnowitz, George (1973). Dialect Boundaries and the Question of Franco-Provençal. Paris & The Hague: Mouton de Gruyter & Co. 
 Kattenbusch, Dieter (1982), Das Frankoprovenzalische in Süditalien: Studien zur synchronischen und diachronischen Dialektologie (Tübinger Beiträge zur Linguistik), Tübingen, Germany: Gunter Narr Verlag. 
 Kasstan, Jonathan and Naomi Nagy, eds. 2018. Special issue: "Francoprovencal: Documenting Contact Varieties in Europe and North America." International Journal of the Sociology of Language 249.
 Kasstan, Jonathan (2015). Lyonnais (Francoprovençal). Illustrations of the IPA: Journal of the International Phonetic Association, 45(3), pp. 349-355.
 Martin, Jean-Baptiste & Tuaillon, Gaston (1999). Atlas linguistique et ethnographique du Jura et des Alpes du nord (Francoprovençal Central) : La maison, l'homme, la morphologie. (Vol. 3). Paris: CNRS Éditions.  (cf. Savoyard dialect).
 Martin, Jean-Baptiste (2005). Le Francoprovençal de poche. Chennevières-sur-Marne: Assimil. 
 Martinet, André (1956). La Description phonologique avec application au parler franco-provençal d'Hauteville (Savoie). Genève: Librairie Droz / M.J. Minard.
 Marzys, Zygmunt (Ed.) (1971). Colloque de dialectologie francoprovençale. Actes. Neuchâtel & Genève: Faculté des Lettres, Droz.
 Melillo, Michele (1974), Donde e quando vennero i francoprovenzali di Capitanata, "Lingua e storia in Puglia"; Siponto, Italy: Centro di Studi pugliesi. pp. 80–95
 Meune, Manuel (2007). Le franco(-)provençal entre morcellement et quête d’unité : histoire et état des lieux. Québec: Laval University. Article in French from TLFQ 
 Minichelli, Vincenzo (1994). Dizionario francoprovenzale di Celle di San Vito e Faeto. (2nd ed.). (Telmon, Tullio, Intro.). Alessandria: Edizioni dell'Orso. 
 Morosi, Giacomo (1890–92), Il dialetto franco-provenzale di Faeto e Celle, nell'Italia meridionale, "Archivio Glottologico Italiano", XII. pp. 33–75
 Nagy, Naomi (2000). Faetar. Munich: Lincom Europa. 
 Nelde, Peter H. (1996). Euromosaic: The production and reproduction of the minority language groups in the European Union. Luxembourg: European Commission.  See: EUROPA, 2005.
 Nizier du Puitspelu (pen name of Tisseur, Clair) (2008). Le Littré de la Grand'Côte : à l'usage de ceux qui veulent parler et écrire correctement. Lyon: Éditions Lyonnaises d'Art et d'Histoire.  (Original work published, Lyon: Juré de l'Académie/Académie du Gourguillon, 1894, reprint 1903). Lyonnaise dialect dictionary and encyclopedia of anecdotes and idiomatic expressions, pp. 353.
 Pierrehumbert, William (1926). Dictionnaire historique du parler neuchâtelois et suisse romand. Neuchâtel: Éditions Victor Attinger.
 Price, Glanville (1998). Encyclopedia of the Languages of Europe. Oxford: Blackwell Publishers. 
 Ruhlen, Merritt (1987). A Guide to the World's Languages. (Vol. 1: Classification). Stanford: Stanford University Press.  Author of numerous articles on language and linguistics; Language Universals Project, Stanford University.
 Schüle, Ernest (1978), Histoire et évolution des parler francoprovençaux d'Italie, in: AA. VV, "Lingue e dialetti nell'arco alpino occidentale; Atti del Convegno Internazionale di Torino", Torino, Italy: Centro Studi Piemontesi.
 Stich, Dominique (2003). Dictionnaire francoprovençal / français, français / francoprovençal : Dictionnaire des mots de base du francoprovençal : Orthographe ORB supradialectale standardisée. (Walter, Henriette, Preface). Thonon-les-Bains: Éditions Le Carré.  This work includes the current orthographic standard for the language.
 Stich, Dominique (1998). Parlons francoprovençal: Une langue méconnue. Paris: Éditions l'Harmattan.  This work includes the former orthographic standard, Orthographe de référence A (ORA).
 Tuaillon, Gaston (1988). Le Franco-provençal, Langue oubliée. in: Vermes, Geneviève (Dir.). Vingt-cinq communautés linguistiques de la France. (Vol. 1: Langues régionales et langues non territorialisées). Paris: Éditions l’Harmattan. pp. 188–207.
 Tuallion, Gaston (2002). La littérature en francoprovençal avant 1700. Grenoble: Ellug. 
 Villefranche, Jacques Melchior (1891). Essai de grammaire du patois Lyonnais. Bourg: Imprimerie J. M. Villefranche.
 Viret, Roger (2001). Patois du pays de l'Albanais: Dictionnaire savoyarde-français. (2nd ed.). Cran-Gévrier: L'Echevé du Val-de-Fier.  Dictionary and grammar for the dialect in the Albanais region, which includes Annecy and Aix-les-Bains.
 Viret, Roger (2021). Dictionnaire Français - Savoyard: Comportant plusieurs variantes de la langue savoyarde.
 Vurpas, Anne-Marie (1993). Le Parler lyonnais. (Martin, Jean-Baptiste, Intro.) Paris: Éditions Payot & Rivages. 
 Wartburg, Walter von (1928–2003). Französisches Etymologisches Wörterbuch. ("FEW"). (25 vol.). Bonn, Basel & Nancy: Klopp, Helbing & Lichtenhahn, INaLF/ATILF. Etymological dictionary of Gallo-Roman languages and dialects.

 External links 

 Arpitan Cultural Alliance, International Federation''
 Francoprovencal.org Le site du francoprovençal
 Centre d'Études Francoprovençales of Saint-Nicolas, Aosta Valley
 On-line directory regularly updated
 Google Maps, Precise Map of Arpitania
  Precise Map of Arpitania and Occitania in Italy and Switzerland

 
Definitely endangered languages
Endangered Romance languages
Languages of Aosta Valley
Languages of Switzerland
Languages of France
Synthetic languages